General Charles James Otway (1694 - 6 August 1764) was an eighteenth century senior commander in the British Army.

Military career
In 1712, Otway joined Lord Mohun's Regiment of Foot and in 1715 he fought against the Jacobites in the inconclusive Battle of Sherrifmuir. He was colonel of the 35th Regiment of Foot from 1717 until his death in 1764.  During this extraordinarily long colonecy, the Regiment was known as Otway's Foot, even after the practice of identifying regiments by the name of their colonel was officially abolished in 1751.

His promotions were as follows:
Brigadier-General: 1735
Major-General: 1739
General: 1761

Personal life
In 1730, Otway married Lady Bridget Fielding, the daughter of the Basil Feilding, 4th Earl of Denbigh.

References

1694 births
1764 deaths
British Army generals